The National Alliance (NA) is a South African political party that competed in the Western Cape province for the South African 2009 provincial election.

The party failed to win any seats.

Election results

Provincial elections 

! rowspan=2 | Election
! colspan=2 | Eastern Cape
! colspan=2 | Free State
! colspan=2 | Gauteng
! colspan=2 | Kwazulu-Natal
! colspan=2 | Limpopo
! colspan=2 | Mpumalanga
! colspan=2 | North-West
! colspan=2 | Northern Cape
! colspan=2 | Western Cape
|-
! % !! Seats
! % !! Seats
! % !! Seats
! % !! Seats
! % !! Seats
! % !! Seats
! % !! Seats
! % !! Seats
! % !! Seats
|-
! 2009
| - || -
| - || -
| - || -
| - || -
| - || -
| - || -
| - || -
| - || -
| 0.10 || 0/42
|-
|}

References

External links
National Alliance

Political parties in South Africa